The Ontario Government House Leader is the provincial cabinet minister responsible for planning and managing the government's legislative program in the Legislative Assembly of Ontario.  The position is not legally entitled to cabinet standing on its own so all Government House Leaders must simultaneously hold another portfolio (or be specifically designated as a minister without portfolio).

House Leaders at the federal level are often granted sinecure assignments to give them cabinet standing while allowing them to focus exclusively on house business.  This has not been the case at the provincial level.  In recent years, John Baird and Dwight Duncan have served as Government House Leaders while simultaneously holding the high-profile Minister of Energy position.

The current Government House Leader is Paul Calandra (as of June 20, 2019).

Government House Leaders

See also
Government House Leader for the equivalent position in the federal House of Commons
House Leader

Government House Leader